The 1972 Eastern Suburbs season was the 65th in the club's history. They competed in the NSWRFL's 1972 premiership, winning 18 of their 25 matches and finishing runners-up, defeated by Manly-Warringah.

Team

 Coach- Don Furner
 Captain- Ron Coote
 Lineup-
 FB Allan McKean
 WG Jim Porter
 CE Harry Cameron
 CE Mark Harris
 WG Bill Mullins
 FE John Ballesty
 HB Kevin Junee
 PR John Armstrong
 HK Peter Moscatt
 PR Arthur Beetson
 SR Greg Bandiera
 John Quayle
 LK Ron Coote (c)
 SR Laurie Freier
 Mick Alchin
 Johnny Mayes
 Kel Jones
 Dick Thornett
 Phil Hawthorne
 C. Boyd
 C. Renilson
 P. Flanders

Ladder

Season summary

 Eastern Suburbs finished the season as runners-up, beaten by Manly Warringah 19-14in the grand final.
 Allan McKean was the highest point scorer for the New South Wales Rugby League(NSWRL) in the 1972 season.

References

 The Story Of Australian Rugby League, Gary Lester

Sydney Roosters seasons
Eastern Suburbs season